The Latin Rhythm Albums chart is a music chart published in Billboard magazine. This data is compiled by Nielsen SoundScan from a sample that includes music stores, music departments at electronics and department stores, internet sales (both physical and digital) and verifiable sales from concert venues in the United States to determine the top-selling Latin rhythm albums in the United States each week. The chart is composed of studio, live, and compilation releases by Latin artists performing in the Latin hip hop, urban, dance and reggaeton, the most popular Latin rhythm music genres.

There were seven number-one albums in 2008. Panaminian DJ Flex hit the chart for the first time and peaked number one for 16 weeks with his debut album Te Quiero. Reggaeton Duo Wisin & Yandel stayed at the number one forn 18 weeks with Los Extatrestres and become the second best selling Latin album of the year with 250,000 copies.

Albums

References 

Rhythm 2008
United States Latin Rhythm Albums
2008 in Latin music